Jean-Luc Adorno (born 30 June 1961) is a Monegasque swimmer. He competed in the men's 100 metre freestyle at the 1984 Summer Olympics.

References

External links

1961 births
Living people
Monegasque male freestyle swimmers
Olympic swimmers of Monaco
Swimmers at the 1984 Summer Olympics
Place of birth missing (living people)